Stanley Ellis (12 February 1896 – 14 February 1987) was an English cricketer.  Ellis was a right-handed batsman who bowled right-arm off break, and who occasionally fielded as a wicket-keeper.  He was born in Ramsbottom, Lancashire.

Ellis made his first-class debut for Lancashire against Derbyshire in the 1923 County Championship.  He made seven further first-class appearances for the county, the last of which came against Warwickshire in the 1924 County Championship.  In his eight first-class matches, he scored 57 runs at an average of 9.50, with a high score of 25.  With the ball, he took 14 wickets at a bowling average of 20.42, with best figures of 5/21.  These figures, which were his only first-class five wicket haul, came against Gloucestershire in 1923.  He left Lancashire at the end of the 1925 season.  Ellis joined Durham in 1929, making his debut for the county in the Minor Counties Championship against the Lancashire Second XI.  He played Minor counties cricket for Durham from 1929 to 1937, making 68 appearances and taking 294 wickets for the county.

His brother, Walker and father, Jeremy, both played first-class cricket for Lancashire.  Ellis died at Wilpshire, Lancashire on 14 February 1987, at the time of his death he was the oldest surviving Lancashire player.

References

External links
Stanley Ellis at ESPNcricinfo
Stanley Ellis at CricketArchive

1896 births
1987 deaths
People from Ramsbottom
English cricketers
Lancashire cricketers
Durham cricketers